The First Law is an extant 1918 silent film directed by Lawrence McGill and starring Irene Castle. It was distributed through Pathé Exchange.

Cast
Irene Castle - Norma Webb
Antonio Moreno - Hugh Godwin
J. H. Gilmour - Dr. Webb
Marguerite Snow - Madeleine
Edward Connelly - Detective

Preservation status
The film survives in the UCLA Film & Television collection.

References

External links

preserved lantern slide(archived)
2nd version of slide(archived)

1918 films
American silent feature films
American black-and-white films
Pathé Exchange films
1910s American films